Cadzand is a village in the Dutch province of Zeeland. It is located in the municipality of Sluis, about 8 km northwest of Oostburg.   The village contains 790 inhabitants (2010).   Better known to many visitors is the nearby beach at Cadzand-Bad.

Cadzand was the scene of two battles during the Hundred Years' War
1337-Battle of Cadzand
1387-Battle of Margate
 
Under the Secret Treaty of Dover, concluded in 1670 between Charles II of England and Louis XIV of France, England was supposed to get possession of Cadzand  as well as Walcheren, as the reward for helping France in the then impending war against the Dutch Republic. In the event, the Dutch resistance - much stronger than anticipated - managed to repulse the French-English attack, and the treaty was not implemented.

In 1685 Cadzand was an important station on the escape route of Jean Harlan, a Huguenot from Calais, who escaped after Louis XIV's  Revocation of the Edict of Nantes, reached Cadzand in a small boat and eventually founded a successful merchant family in Germany.  Cadzand was also an important destination that year and shortly thereafter for other Huguenot refugees from the Calais area when their temple at Guinness was demolished by royal decree in the summer of that year.  Three in particular were the Morel brothers, Isaac, Jacob and Pierre (changed to Pieter after moving to Cadzand), and the two brothers Jacob and Isaac Van Houte.  All five "had been large landowners at Guemps, Offequerque, Hames, and Andres, close to Calais." Similar to a sister church in Canterbury, Kent, England, they helped re-build in Cadzand the mother church they lost in Guinness, Calais.

During the year 1847 a large exodus of people from Cadzand, occurred, mainly to the United States.  One ship, the "bark Maria", carried within it that year a significant number of Cadzanders, like Isaac LeMahieu and Suzanne Morel. 

Until 1 April 1970, Cadzand was a separate municipality. It then was annexed by the municipality of Oostburg.  It was in January 2003, with the merger of Sluis-Aardenburg and Oostburg, that Cadzand found itself within the newly enlarged municipality of Sluis.

gallery

References

External links
 

Seaside resorts in the Netherlands
Populated places in Zeeland
Former municipalities of Zeeland
Populated coastal places in the Netherlands
Sluis
Zeelandic Flanders